"New Low" is a song written by Zack Lopez and Sean Stockham recorded by Middle Class Rut from their 2008 Extended Play Red and their 2010 album No Name No Color. The song is featured in the NBA 2K12 soundtrack.

Charts

References

2008 songs
Middle Class Rut songs

2010 singles
2010 songs